is a Japanese footballer who plays as a winger for J2 League club Mito Hollyhock, on loan from Urawa Red Diamonds.

Career statistics

Club
.

References

External links

2001 births
Living people
Sportspeople from Sendai
Association football people from Miyagi Prefecture
Japanese footballers
Japan youth international footballers
Association football midfielders
J1 League players
J2 League players
Urawa Red Diamonds players
FC Ryukyu players
Oita Trinita players
Mito HollyHock players